The 2017–18 Ole Miss Rebels men's basketball team represented the University of Mississippi in the 2017–18 NCAA Division I men's basketball season, their 108th basketball season. They were coached by Andy Kennedy for the first 27 games of the season before he left the position on February 19, 2018. The Rebels named assistant coach Tony Madlock interim head coach for the remainder of the season. The Rebels played their second full season in The Pavilion at Ole Miss in Oxford, Mississippi as members of the Southeastern Conference. They finished the season 12–20, 5–13 in SEC play to finish in last place. They lost in the first round of the SEC tournament to South Carolina.

On February 12, 2018, 12th-year head coach Andy Kennedy, the school's all-time winningest head coach, and the school mutually agreed to part ways following the end of the season. However, on February 19, Kennedy announced that he would depart immediately, with assistant Madlock taking over on an interim basis. On March 15, 2018, it was announced that Ole Miss had hired Middle Tennessee head coach Kermit Davis as head coach of the Rebels.

Previous season
The Rebels finished the 2016–17 season 22–14, 10–8 in SEC play to finish in a three-way tie for fifth place. They defeated Missouri in the second round of the SEC tournament before losing in the quarterfinals to Arkansas. They were invited to the National Invitation Tournament where they defeated Monmouth and Syracuse before losing in the quarterfinals to Georgia Tech.

Offseason

Coaching changes 
On April 24, 2017 Ole Miss announced the hiring of former Rebel basketball player Rahim Lockhart as an assistant coach on the Rebel basketball team. On May 8, 2017 Ole Miss assistant coach Bill Armstrong left the Rebels to take the same position at Louisiana State University.

Departures

2017 recruiting class

2018 recruiting class

Preseason

Roster

Schedule and results
On June 27, 2017 Mississippi announced its 2017–18 non-conference schedule, highlighted by opponents such as Virginia Tech, Middle Tennessee, Illinois State, and Texas. The Rebels will also face Utah and Rice in the MGM Resorts Main Event.
|-
!colspan=12 style=|Exhibition

|-
!colspan=12 style=|Regular Season

|-
!colspan=12 style="background:#; color:white;"| SEC tournament

See also
•2018 Ole Miss Rebels football team
•2018 Ole Miss Rebels baseball team
•2017-18 Ole Miss Rebels women's basketball team

References 

Ole Miss
Ole Miss Rebels men's basketball seasons
Ole Miss Rebels basketball
Ole Miss Rebels basketball